This is a list of the bird species recorded in Cambodia. The avifauna of Cambodia include a total of 666 species, of which 2 have been introduced by humans. 2 species are endemic to Cambodia.

This list's taxonomic treatment (designation and sequence of orders, families and species) and nomenclature (common and scientific names) follow the conventions of The Clements Checklist of Birds of the World, 2022 edition. The family accounts at the beginning of each heading reflect this taxonomy, as do the species counts found in each family account. Introduced species are included in the total species counts for Cambodia.

The following tags have been used to highlight several categories. The commonly occurring native species do not fall into any of these categories.

(A) Accidental - a species that rarely or accidentally occurs in Cambodia
(I) Introduced - a species introduced to Cambodia as a consequence, direct or indirect, of human actions
(E) Endemic - a species endemic to Cambodia

Ducks, geese, and waterfowl
Order: AnseriformesFamily: Anatidae

Anatidae includes the ducks and most duck-like waterfowl, such as geese and swans. These birds are adapted to an aquatic existence with webbed feet, flattened bills, and feathers that are excellent at shedding water due to an oily coating.

Lesser whistling-duck, Dendrocygna javanica
Knob-billed duck, Sarkidiornis melanotos
Cotton pygmy-goose, Nettapus coromandelianus
Garganey, Spatula querquedula
Northern shoveler, Spatula clypeata (A)
Eurasian wigeon, Mareca penelope (A)
Indian spot-billed duck, Anas poecilorhyncha
Northern pintail, Anas acuta
Green-winged teal, Anas crecca
White-winged duck, Cairina scutulata
Ferruginous duck, Aythya nyroca (A)
Tufted duck, Aythya fuligula (A)
Greater scaup, Aythya marila (A)

Pheasants, grouse, and allies
Order: GalliformesFamily: Phasianidae

The Phasianidae are a family of terrestrial birds. In general, they are plump (although they vary in size) and have broad, relatively short wings.

Chestnut-headed partridge, Arborophila cambodiana
Bar-backed partridge, Arborophila brunneopectus
Orange-necked partridge, Arborophila davidi
Silver pheasant, Lophura nycthemera
Siamese fireback, Lophura diardi
Green peafowl, Pavo muticus
Scaly-breasted partridge, Tropicoperdix chloropus
Germain's peacock-pheasant, Polyplectron germaini
Gray peacock-pheasant, Polyplectron bicalcaratum
Red junglefowl, Gallus gallus
Chinese francolin, Francolinus pintadeanus
Blue-breasted quail, Synoicus chinensis
Common quail, Coturnix coturnix
Rain quail, Coturnix coromandelica

Flamingos
Order: PhoenicopteriformesFamily: Phoenicopteridae

Flamingos filter-feed on shellfish and algae. Their oddly shaped beaks are specially adapted to separate mud and silt from the food they consume and, uniquely, are used upside-down.

Greater flamingo, Phoenicopterus roseus (Ex)

Grebes
Order: PodicipediformesFamily: Podicipedidae

Grebes are small to medium-large freshwater diving birds. They have lobed toes and are excellent swimmers and divers. However, they have their feet placed far back on the body, making them quite ungainly on land.

Little grebe, Tachybaptus ruficollis

Pigeons and doves
Order: ColumbiformesFamily: Columbidae

Pigeons and doves are stout-bodied birds with short necks and short slender bills with a fleshy cere.

Rock pigeon, Columba livia (I)
Pale-capped pigeon, Columba punicea
Oriental turtle-dove, Streptopelia orientalis
Red collared-dove, Streptopelia tranquebarica
Spotted dove, Streptopelia chinensis
Barred cuckoo-dove, Macropygia unchall
Asian emerald dove, Chalcophaps indica
Zebra dove, Geopelia striata
Nicobar pigeon, Caloenas nicobarica (A)
Pink-necked green-pigeon, Treron vernans
Orange-breasted green-pigeon, Treron bicincta
Ashy-headed green-pigeon, Treron phayrei
Thick-billed green-pigeon, Treron curvirostra
Yellow-footed green-pigeon, Treron phoenicoptera
Yellow-vented green-pigeon, Treron seimundi
Pin-tailed green-pigeon, Treron apicauda
Wedge-tailed green-pigeon, Treron sphenura
Green imperial-pigeon, Ducula aenea
Mountain imperial-pigeon, Ducula badia
Pied imperial-pigeon, Ducula bicolor

Bustards
Order: OtidiformesFamily: Otididae

Bustards are large terrestrial birds mainly associated with dry open country and steppes in the Old World. They are omnivorous and nest on the ground. They walk steadily on strong legs and big toes, pecking for food as they go. They have long broad wings with "fingered" wingtips and striking patterns in flight. Many have interesting mating displays.

Bengal florican, Houbaropsis bengalensis

Cuckoos
Order: CuculiformesFamily: Cuculidae

The family Cuculidae includes cuckoos, roadrunners and anis. These birds are of variable size with slender bodies, long tails and strong legs. The Old World cuckoos are brood parasites.

Coral-billed ground-cuckoo, Carpococcyx renauldi
Greater coucal, Centropus sinensis
Lesser coucal, Centropus bengalensis
Green-billed malkoha, Phaenicophaeus tristis
Chestnut-winged cuckoo, Clamator coromandus
Pied cuckoo, Clamator jacobinus (A)
Asian koel, Eudynamys scolopacea
Asian emerald cuckoo, Chrysococcyx maculatus
Violet cuckoo, Chrysococcyx xanthorhynchus
Little bronze-cuckoo, Chrysococcyx minutillus (A)
Banded bay cuckoo, Cacomantis sonneratii
Plaintive cuckoo, Cacomantis merulinus
Square-tailed drongo-cuckoo, Surniculus lugubris
Large hawk-cuckoo, Hierococcyx sparverioides
Hodgson's hawk-cuckoo, Hierococcyx nisicolor (A)
Malaysian hawk-cuckoo, Hierococcyx fugax
Indian cuckoo, Cuculus micropterus
Himalayan cuckoo, Cuculus saturatus
Common cuckoo, Cuculus canorus (A)

Frogmouths
Order: CaprimulgiformesFamily: Podargidae

The frogmouths are a group of nocturnal birds related to the nightjars. They are named for their large flattened hooked bill and huge frog-like gape, which they use to take insects.

Blyth's frogmouth, Batrachostomus affinis

Nightjars and allies
Order: CaprimulgiformesFamily: Caprimulgidae

Nightjars are medium-sized nocturnal birds that usually nest on the ground. They have long wings, short legs and very short bills. Most have small feet, of little use for walking, and long pointed wings. Their soft plumage is camouflaged to resemble bark or leaves.

Great eared-nightjar, Lyncornis macrotis
Gray nightjar, Caprimulgus jotaka
Large-tailed nightjar, Caprimulgus macrurus
Indian nightjar, Caprimulgus asiaticus
Savanna nightjar, Caprimulgus affinis

Swifts
Order: CaprimulgiformesFamily: Apodidae

Swifts are small birds which spend the majority of their lives flying. These birds have very short legs and never settle voluntarily on the ground, perching instead only on vertical surfaces. Many swifts have long swept-back wings which resemble a crescent or boomerang.

White-throated needletail, Hirundapus caudacutus
Silver-backed needletail, Hirundapus cochinchinensis
Brown-backed needletail, Hirundapus giganteus
Himalayan swiftlet, Aerodramus brevirostris
Germain's swiftlet, Aerodramus germani
Pacific swift, Apus pacificus
Cook's swift, Apus cooki
House swift, Apus nipalensis
Asian palm-swift, Cypsiurus balasiensis

Treeswifts
Order: CaprimulgiformesFamily: Hemiprocnidae

The treeswifts, also called crested swifts, are closely related to the true swifts. They differ from the other swifts in that they have crests, long forked tails and softer plumage.

Crested treeswift, Hemiprocne coronata

Rails, crakes, gallinules and coots
Order: GruiformesFamily: Rallidae

Rallidae is a large family of small to medium-sized birds which includes the rails, crakes, coots and gallinules. Typically they inhabit dense vegetation in damp environments near lakes, swamps or rivers. In general they are shy and secretive birds, making them difficult to observe. Most species have strong legs and long toes which are well adapted to soft uneven surfaces. They tend to have short, rounded wings and to be weak fliers.

Water rail, Rallus aquaticus (A)
Brown-cheeked rail, Rallus indicus (A)
Slaty-breasted rail, Lewinia striata
Eurasian moorhen, Gallinula chloropus
Eurasian coot, Fulica atra
Gray-headed swamphen, Porphyrio poliocephalus
White-browed crake, Poliolimnas cinereus
Watercock, Gallicrex cinerea
White-breasted waterhen, Amaurornis phoenicurus
Red-legged crake, Rallina fasciata (A)
Slaty-legged crake, Rallina eurizonoides
Ruddy-breasted crake, Zapornia fusca
Baillon's crake, Zapornia pusilla

Finfoots
Order: GruiformesFamily: Heliornithidae

Heliornithidae is a small family of tropical birds with webbed lobes on their feet similar to those of grebes and coots.

Masked finfoot, Heliopais personata

Cranes
Order: GruiformesFamily: Gruidae

Cranes are large, long-legged and long-necked birds. Unlike the similar-looking but unrelated herons, cranes fly with necks outstretched, not pulled back. Most have elaborate and noisy courting displays or "dances".

Demoiselle crane, Anthropoides virgo (A)
Sarus crane, Antigone antigone

Thick-knees
Order: CharadriiformesFamily: Burhinidae

The stone-curlews are a group of largely tropical waders in the family Burhinidae. They are found worldwide within the tropical zone, with some species also breeding in temperate Europe and Australia. They are medium to large waders with strong black or yellow-black bills, large yellow eyes and cryptic plumage. Despite being classed as waders, most species have a preference for arid or semi-arid habitats.

Indian thick-knee, Burhinus indicus
Great thick-knee, Esacus recurvirostris

Stilts and avocets
Order: CharadriiformesFamily: Recurvirostridae

Recurvirostridae is a family of large wading birds, which includes the avocets and stilts. The avocets have long legs and long up-curved bills. The stilts have extremely long legs and long, thin, straight bills.

Black-winged stilt, Himantopus himantopus
Pied stilt, Himantopus leucocephalus (A)

Plovers and lapwings
Order: CharadriiformesFamily: Charadriidae

The family Charadriidae includes the plovers, dotterels and lapwings. They are small to medium-sized birds with compact bodies, short, thick necks and long, usually pointed, wings. They are found in open country worldwide, mostly in habitats near water.

Black-bellied plover, Pluvialis squatarola
Pacific golden-plover, Pluvialis fulva
River lapwing, Vanellus duvaucelii
Gray-headed lapwing, Vanellus cinereus
Red-wattled lapwing, Vanellus indicus
Lesser sand-plover, Charadrius mongolus
Greater sand-plover, Charadrius leschenaultii
Malaysian plover, Charadrius peronii
Kentish plover, Charadrius alexandrinus
White-faced plover, Charadrius dealbatus
Common ringed plover, Charadrius hiaticula (A)
Little ringed plover, Charadrius dubius
Oriental plover, Charadrius veredus

Painted-snipes
Order: CharadriiformesFamily: Rostratulidae

Painted-snipes are short-legged, long-billed birds similar in shape to the true snipes, but more brightly coloured.

Greater painted-snipe, Rostratula benghalensis

Jacanas
Order: CharadriiformesFamily: Jacanidae

The jacanas are a group of tropical waders in the family Jacanidae. They are found throughout the tropics. They are identifiable by their huge feet and claws which enable them to walk on floating vegetation in the shallow lakes that are their preferred habitat.

Pheasant-tailed jacana, Hydrophasianus chirurgus
Bronze-winged jacana, Metopidius indicus

Sandpipers and allies
Order: CharadriiformesFamily: Scolopacidae

Scolopacidae is a large diverse family of small to medium-sized shorebirds including the sandpipers, curlews, godwits, shanks, tattlers, woodcocks, snipes, dowitchers and phalaropes. The majority of these species eat small invertebrates picked out of the mud or soil. Variation in length of legs and bills enables multiple species to feed in the same habitat, particularly on the coast, without direct competition for food.

Whimbrel, Numenius phaeopus
Far Eastern curlew, Numenius madagascariensis
Eurasian curlew, Numenius arquata
Bar-tailed godwit, Limosa lapponica
Black-tailed godwit, Limosa limosa
Ruddy turnstone, Arenaria interpres
Great knot, Calidris tenuirostris
Red knot, Calidris canutus (A)
Ruff, Calidris pugnax
Broad-billed sandpiper, Calidris falcinellus
Sharp-tailed sandpiper, Calidris acuminata (A)
Curlew sandpiper, Calidris ferruginea
Temminck's stint, Calidris temminckii
Long-toed stint, Calidris subminuta
Spoon-billed sandpiper, Calidris pygmaea (A)
Red-necked stint, Calidris ruficollis
Sanderling, Calidris alba
Dunlin, Calidris alpina (A)
Little stint, Calidris minuta (A)
Asian dowitcher, Limnodromus semipalmatus
Long-billed dowitcher, Limnodromus scolopaceus (A)
Jack snipe, Lymnocryptes minimus (A)
Eurasian woodcock, Scolopax rusticola
Common snipe, Gallinago gallinago
Pin-tailed snipe, Gallinago stenura
Terek sandpiper, Xenus cinereus
Red-necked phalarope, Phalaropus lobatus (A)
Common sandpiper, Actitis hypoleucos
Green sandpiper, Tringa ochropus
Gray-tailed tattler, Tringa brevipes (A)
Spotted redshank, Tringa erythropus
Common greenshank, Tringa nebularia
Nordmann's greenshank, Tringa guttifer
Marsh sandpiper, Tringa stagnatilis
Wood sandpiper, Tringa glareola
Common redshank, Tringa totanus

Buttonquail
Order: GruiformesFamily: Turnicidae

The buttonquail are small, drab, running birds which resemble the true quails. The female is the brighter of the sexes and initiates courtship. The male incubates the eggs and tends the young.

Small buttonquail, Turnix sylvatica
Yellow-legged buttonquail, Turnix tanki
Barred buttonquail, Turnix suscitator

Pratincoles and coursers
Order: CharadriiformesFamily: Glareolidae

Glareolidae is a family of wading birds comprising the pratincoles, which have short legs, long pointed wings and long forked tails, and the coursers, which have long legs, short wings and long, pointed bills which curve downwards.

Oriental pratincole, Glareola maldivarum
Small pratincole, Glareola lactea

Skuas and jaegers
Order: CharadriiformesFamily: Stercorariidae

The family Stercorariidae are, in general, medium to large birds, typically with grey or brown plumage, often with white markings on the wings. They nest on the ground in temperate and arctic regions and are long-distance migrants.

Pomarine jaeger, Stercorarius pomarinus
Parasitic jaeger, Stercorarius parasiticus
Long-tailed jaeger, Stercorarius longicaudus

Gulls, terns, and skimmers
Order: CharadriiformesFamily: Laridae

Laridae is a family of medium to large seabirds, the gulls, terns and skimmers. Gulls are typically grey or white, often with black markings on the head or wings. They have stout, longish bills and webbed feet. Terns are a group of generally medium to large seabirds typically with grey or white plumage, often with black markings on the head. Most terns hunt fish by diving but some pick insects off the surface of fresh water. Terns are generally long-lived birds, with several species known to live in excess of 30 years. Skimmers are a small family of tropical tern-like birds. They have an elongated lower mandible which they use to feed by flying low over the water surface and skimming the water for small fish.

Slender-billed gull, Chroicocephalus genei (A)
Black-headed gull, Chroicocephalus ridibundus
Brown-headed gull, Chroicocephalus brunnicephalus
Black-tailed gull, Larus crassirostris (A)
Lesser black-backed gull, Larus fuscus (A)
Brown noddy, Anous stolidus
Bridled tern, Onychoprion anaethetus
Aleutian tern, Onychoprion aleuticus (A)
Little tern, Sternula albifrons
Gull-billed tern, Gelochelidon nilotica
Caspian tern, Hydroprogne caspia
White-winged tern, Chlidonias leucopterus
Whiskered tern, Chlidonias hybrida
Black-naped tern, Sterna sumatrana
Common tern, Sterna hirundo
Black-bellied tern, Sterna acuticauda (Ex)
River tern, Sterna aurantia
Great crested tern, Thalasseus bergii
Lesser crested tern, Thalasseus bengalensis (A)
Indian skimmer, Rynchops albicollis (Ex)

Shearwaters and petrels
Order: ProcellariiformesFamily: Procellariidae

The procellariids are the main group of medium-sized "true petrels", characterised by united nostrils with medium septum and a long outer functional primary.

Bulwer's petrel, Bulweria bulwerii (A)

Storks
Order: CiconiiformesFamily: Ciconiidae

Storks are large, long-legged, long-necked, wading birds with long, stout bills. Storks are mute, but bill-clattering is an important mode of communication at the nest. Their nests can be large and may be reused for many years. Many species are migratory.

Asian openbill, Anastomus oscitans
Black stork, Ciconia nigra (A)
Asian woolly-necked stork, Ciconia episcopus
White stork, Ciconia ciconia (A)
Black-necked stork, Ephippiorhynchus asiaticus
Lesser adjutant, Leptoptilos javanicus
Greater adjutant, Leptoptilos dubius
Milky stork, Mycteria cinerea
Painted stork, Mycteria leucocephala

Frigatebirds
Order: SuliformesFamily: Fregatidae

Frigatebirds are large seabirds usually found over tropical oceans. They are large, black-and-white or completely black, with long wings and deeply forked tails. The males have coloured inflatable throat pouches. They do not swim or walk and cannot take off from a flat surface. Having the largest wingspan-to-body-weight ratio of any bird, they are essentially aerial, able to stay aloft for more than a week.

Lesser frigatebird, Fregata ariel
Christmas Island frigatebird, Fregata andrewsi

Boobies and gannets
Order: SuliformesFamily: Sulidae

The gannets and boobies are medium to large coastal seabirds that plunge-dive for fish.

 Red-footed booby, Sula sula (A)

Anhingas
Order: SuliformesFamily: Anhingidae

Anhingas or darters are often called "snake-birds" because of their long thin neck, which gives a snake-like appearance when they swim with their bodies submerged. The males have black and dark-brown plumage, an erectile crest on the nape and a larger bill than the female. The females have much paler plumage especially on the neck and underparts. The darters have completely webbed feet and their legs are short and set far back on the body. Their plumage is somewhat permeable, like that of cormorants, and they spread their wings to dry after diving.

Oriental darter, Anhinga melanogaster

Cormorants and shags
Order: SuliformesFamily: Phalacrocoracidae

Phalacrocoracidae is a family of medium to large coastal, fish-eating seabirds that includes cormorants and shags. Plumage colouration varies, with the majority having mainly dark plumage, some species being black-and-white and a few being colourful.

Little cormorant, Microcarbo niger
Great cormorant, Phalacrocorax carbo
Indian cormorant, Phalacrocorax fuscicollis

Pelicans
Order: PelecaniformesFamily: Pelecanidae

Pelicans are large water birds with a distinctive pouch under their beak. As with other members of the order Pelecaniformes, they have webbed feet with four toes.

Great white pelican, Pelecanus onocrotalus (A)
Spot-billed pelican, Pelecanus philippensis

Herons, egrets, and bitterns
Order: PelecaniformesFamily: Ardeidae

The family Ardeidae contains the bitterns, herons and egrets. Herons and egrets are medium to large wading birds with long necks and legs. Bitterns tend to be shorter necked and more wary. Members of Ardeidae fly with their necks retracted, unlike other long-necked birds such as storks, ibises and spoonbills.

Great bittern, Botaurus stellaris (A)
Yellow bittern, Ixobrychus sinensis
Schrenck's bittern, Ixobrychus eurhythmus (A)
Cinnamon bittern, Ixobrychus cinnamomeus
Black bittern, Ixobrychus flavicollis
Gray heron, Ardea cinerea
Great-billed heron, Ardea sumatrana (A)
Purple heron, Ardea purpurea
Great egret, Ardea alba
Intermediate egret, Ardea intermedia
Chinese egret, Egretta eulophotes (A)
Little egret, Egretta garzetta
Pacific reef-heron, Egretta sacra
Cattle egret, Bubulcus ibis
Chinese pond-heron, Ardeola bacchus
Javan pond-heron, Ardeola speciosa
Striated heron, Butorides striata
Black-crowned night-heron, Nycticorax nycticorax
White-eared night-heron, Gorsachius magnificus (A)
Malayan night-heron, Gorsachius melanolophus

Ibises and spoonbills
Order: PelecaniformesFamily: Threskiornithidae

Threskiornithidae is a family of large terrestrial and wading birds which includes the ibises and spoonbills. They have long, broad wings with 11 primary and about 20 secondary feathers. They are strong fliers and despite their size and weight, very capable soarers.

Glossy ibis, Plegadis falcinellus
Black-headed ibis, Threskiornis melanocephalus
White-shouldered ibis, Pseudibis davisoni
Giant ibis, Pseudibis gigantea
Eurasian spoonbill, Platalea leucorodia (A)
Black-faced spoonbill, Platalea minor (A)

Osprey
Order: AccipitriformesFamily: Pandionidae

The family Pandionidae contains only one species, the osprey. The osprey is a medium-large raptor which is a specialist fish-eater with a worldwide distribution.

Osprey, Pandion haliaetus

Hawks, eagles, and kites
Order: AccipitriformesFamily: Accipitridae

Accipitridae is a family of birds of prey, which includes hawks, eagles, kites, harriers and Old World vultures. These birds have powerful hooked beaks for tearing flesh from their prey, strong legs, powerful talons and keen eyesight.

Black-winged kite, Elanus caeruleus
Oriental honey-buzzard, Pernis ptilorhynchus
Jerdon's baza, Aviceda jerdoni
Black baza, Aviceda leuphotes
Red-headed vulture, Sarcogyps calvus
Cinereous vulture, Aegypius monachus (A)
White-rumped vulture, Gyps bengalensis
Slender-billed vulture, Gyps tenuirostris
Himalayan griffon, Gyps himalayensis (A)
Crested serpent-eagle, Spilornis cheela
Short-toed snake-eagle, Circaetus gallicus
Changeable hawk-eagle, Nisaetus cirrhatus
Mountain hawk-eagle, Nisaetus nipalensis
Rufous-bellied eagle, Lophotriorchis kienerii
Black eagle, Ictinaetus malaiensis
Indian spotted eagle, Clanga hastata (A)
Greater spotted eagle, Clanga clanga
Booted eagle, Hieraaetus pennatus
Steppe eagle, Aquila nipalensis (A)
Imperial eagle, Aquila heliaca
Rufous-winged buzzard, Butastur liventer
Gray-faced buzzard, Butastur indicus
Eurasian marsh-harrier, Circus aeruginosus (A)
Eastern marsh-harrier, Circus spilonotus
Hen harrier, Circus cyaneus (A)
Pied harrier, Circus melanoleucos
Crested goshawk, Accipiter trivirgatus
Shikra, Accipiter badius
Chinese sparrowhawk, Accipiter soloensis
Japanese sparrowhawk, Accipiter gularis
Besra, Accipiter virgatus
Black kite, Milvus migrans
Brahminy kite, Haliastur indus
Pallas's fish-eagle, Haliaeetus leucoryphus (A)
White-bellied sea-eagle, Haliaeetus leucogaster
Lesser fish-eagle, Haliaeetus humilis
Gray-headed fish-eagle, Haliaeetus ichthyaetus
Common buzzard, Buteo buteo
Himalayan buzzard, Buteo refectus (A)
Eastern buzzard, Buteo japonicus

Barn-owls
Order: StrigiformesFamily: Tytonidae

Barn-owls are medium to large owls with large heads and characteristic heart-shaped faces. They have long strong legs with powerful talons.

Australasian grass-owl, Tyto longimembris
Barn owl, Tyto alba
Oriental bay-owl, Phodilus badius

Owls
Order: StrigiformesFamily: Strigidae

The typical owls are small to large solitary nocturnal birds of prey. They have large forward-facing eyes and ears, a hawk-like beak and a conspicuous circle of feathers around each eye called a facial disk.

Mountain scops-owl, Otus spilocephalus
Collared scops-owl, Otus lettia
Oriental scops-owl, Otus sunia
Spot-bellied eagle-owl, Bubo nipalensis
Brown fish-owl, Ketupa zeylonensis
Buffy fish-owl, Ketupa ketupu
Asian barred owlet, Glaucidium cuculoides
Collared owlet, Taenioptynx brodiei
Spotted owlet, Athene brama
Spotted wood-owl, Strix seloputo
Brown wood-owl, Strix leptogrammica
Short-eared owl, Asio flammeus
Brown boobook, Ninox scutulata
Northern boobook, Ninox japonica (A)

Trogons
Order: TrogoniformesFamily: Trogonidae

The family Trogonidae includes trogons and quetzals. Found in tropical woodlands worldwide, they feed on insects and fruit, and their broad bills and weak legs reflect their diet and arboreal habits. Although their flight is fast, they are reluctant to fly any distance. Trogons have soft, often colourful, feathers with distinctive male and female plumage.

Red-headed trogon, Harpactes erythrocephalus
Orange-breasted trogon, Harpactes oreskios

Hoopoes
Order: BucerotiformesFamily: Upupidae

Hoopoes have black, white and orangey-pink colouring with a large erectile crest on their head.

Eurasian hoopoe, Upupa epops

Hornbills
Order: BucerotiformesFamily: Bucerotidae

Hornbills are a group of birds whose bill is shaped like a cow's horn, but without a twist, sometimes with a casque on the upper mandible. Frequently, the bill is brightly coloured.

Great hornbill, Buceros bicornis
Brown hornbill, Anorrhinus austeni
Oriental pied-hornbill, Anthracoceros albirostris
Wreathed hornbill, Rhyticeros undulatus

Kingfishers
Order: CoraciiformesFamily: Alcedinidae

Kingfishers are medium-sized birds with large heads, long, pointed bills, short legs and stubby tails.

Common kingfisher, Alcedo atthis
Blue-eared kingfisher, Alcedo meninting
Black-backed dwarf-kingfisher, Ceyx erithaca
Banded kingfisher, Lacedo pulchella
Stork-billed kingfisher, Pelargopsis capensis
Ruddy kingfisher, Halcyon coromanda
White-throated kingfisher, Halcyon smyrnensis
Black-capped kingfisher, Halcyon pileata
Collared kingfisher, Todirhamphus chloris
Crested kingfisher, Megaceryle lugubris
Pied kingfisher, Ceryle rudis

Bee-eaters
Order: CoraciiformesFamily: Meropidae

The bee-eaters are a group of near passerine birds in the family Meropidae. Most species are found in Africa but others occur in southern Europe, Madagascar, Australia and New Guinea. They are characterised by richly coloured plumage, slender bodies and usually elongated central tail feathers. All are colourful and have long downturned bills and pointed wings, which give them a swallow-like appearance when seen from afar.

Blue-bearded bee-eater, Nyctyornis athertoni
Asian green bee-eater, Merops orientalis
Blue-throated bee-eater, Merops viridis
Blue-tailed bee-eater, Merops philippinus
Chestnut-headed bee-eater, Merops leschenaulti

Typical rollers
Order: CoraciiformesFamily: Coraciidae

Rollers resemble crows in size and build, but are more closely related to the kingfishers and bee-eaters. They share the colourful appearance of those groups with blues and browns predominating. The two inner front toes are connected, but the outer toe is not.

Indochinese roller, Coracias affinis
Dollarbird, Eurystomus orientalis

Asian barbets
Order: PiciformesFamily: Megalaimidae

The Asian barbets are plump birds, with short necks and large heads. They get their name from the bristles which fringe their heavy bills. Most species are brightly coloured.

Coppersmith barbet, Psilopogon haemacephalus
Blue-eared barbet, Psilopogon duvaucelii
Red-vented barbet, Psilopogon lagrandieri
Green-eared barbet, Psilopogon faiostrictus
Lineated barbet, Psilopogon lineatus
Moustached barbet, Psilopogon incognitus
Indochinese barbet, Psilopogon annamensis

Woodpeckers
Order: PiciformesFamily: Picidae

Woodpeckers are small to medium-sized birds with chisel-like beaks, short legs, stiff tails and long tongues used for capturing insects. Some species have feet with two toes pointing forward and two backward, while several species have only three toes. Many woodpeckers have the habit of tapping noisily on tree trunks with their beaks.

Eurasian wryneck, Jynx torquilla (A)
Speckled piculet, Picumnus innominatus
White-browed piculet, Sasia ochracea
Heart-spotted woodpecker, Hemicircus canente
Gray-capped pygmy woodpecker, Yungipicus canicapillus
Yellow-crowned woodpecker, Leiopicus mahrattensis
Rufous-bellied woodpecker, Dendrocopos hyperythrus
Freckle-breasted woodpecker, Dendrocopos analis
Stripe-breasted woodpecker, Dendrocopos atratus
Bay woodpecker, Blythipicus pyrrhotis
Greater flameback, Chrysocolaptes guttacristatus
Rufous woodpecker, Micropternus brachyurus
Black-and-buff woodpecker, Meiglyptes jugularis
Pale-headed woodpecker, Gecinulus grantia
Bamboo woodpecker, Gecinulus viridis (A)
Common flameback, Dinopium javanense
Lesser yellownape, Picus chlorolophus
Streak-throated woodpecker, Picus xanthopygaeus
Red-collared woodpecker, Picus rabieri
Laced woodpecker, Picus vittatus
Gray-headed woodpecker, Picus canus
Black-headed woodpecker, Picus erythropygius
Greater yellownape, Chrysophlegma flavinucha
Great slaty woodpecker, Mulleripicus pulverulentus
White-bellied woodpecker, Dryocopus javensis

Falcons and caracaras
Order: FalconiformesFamily: Falconidae

Falconidae is a family of diurnal birds of prey. They differ from hawks, eagles and kites in that they kill with their beaks instead of their talons.

White-rumped falcon, Polihierax insignis
Collared falconet, Microhierax caerulescens
Lesser kestrel, Falco naumanni
Eurasian kestrel, Falco tinnunculus
Merlin, Falco columbarius (A)
Oriental hobby, Falco severus
Peregrine falcon, Falco peregrinus

Old World parrots
Order: PsittaciformesFamily: Psittaculidae

Characteristic features of parrots include a strong curved bill, an upright stance, strong legs, and clawed zygodactyl feet. Many parrots are vividly coloured, and some are multi-coloured. Old World parrots are found from Africa east across south and southeast Asia and Oceania to Australia and New Zealand.

Alexandrine parakeet, Psittacula eupatria
Gray-headed parakeet, Psittacula finschii
Blossom-headed parakeet, Psittacula roseata
Red-breasted parakeet, Psittacula alexandri
Vernal hanging-parrot, Loriculus vernalis

Asian and Grauer's broadbills
Order: PasseriformesFamily: Eurylaimidae

The broadbills are small, brightly coloured birds, which feed on fruit and also take insects in flycatcher fashion, snapping their broad bills. Their habitat is canopies of wet forests.

Long-tailed broadbill, Psarisomus dalhousiae
Dusky broadbill, Corydon sumatranus
Silver-breasted broadbill, Serilophus lunatus
Black-and-red broadbill, Cymbirhynchus macrorhynchos
Banded broadbill, Eurylaimus javanicus

Pittas
Order: PasseriformesFamily: Pittidae

Pittas are medium-sized by passerine standards and are stocky, with fairly long, strong legs, short tails and stout bills. Many are brightly coloured. They spend the majority of their time on wet forest floors, eating snails, insects and similar invertebrates.

Eared pitta, Hydrornis phayrei
Rusty-naped pitta, Hydrornis oatesi (A)
Blue-rumped pitta, Hydrornis soror
Blue pitta, Hydrornis cyaneus
Bar-bellied pitta, Hydrornis elliotii
Blue-winged pitta, Pitta moluccensis
Fairy pitta, Pitta nympha (A)
Hooded pitta, Pitta sordida

Thornbills and allies
Order: PasseriformesFamily: Acanthizidae

Thornbills are small passerine birds, similar in habits to the tits.

Golden-bellied gerygone, Gerygone sulphurea

Cuckooshrikes
Order: PasseriformesFamily: Campephagidae

The cuckooshrikes are small to medium-sized passerine birds. They are predominantly greyish with white and black, although some species are brightly coloured.

Small minivet, Pericrocotus cinnamomeus
Gray-chinned minivet, Pericrocotus solaris
Scarlet minivet, Pericrocotus flammeus
Ashy minivet, Pericrocotus divaricatus
Brown-rumped minivet, Pericrocotus cantonensis
Rosy minivet, Pericrocotus roseus
Large cuckooshrike, Coracina macei
Black-winged cuckooshrike, Lalage melaschistos
Indochinese cuckooshrike, Lalage polioptera

Vireos, shrike-babblers, and erpornis
Order: PasseriformesFamily: Vireonidae

Most of the members of this family are found in the New World. However, the shrike-babblers and erpornis, which only slightly resemble the "true" vireos and greenlets, are found in South East Asia.

White-browed shrike-babbler, Pteruthius aeralatus
Clicking shrike-babbler, Pteruthius intermedius
White-bellied erpornis, Erpornis zantholeuca

Whistlers
Order: PasseriformesFamily: Pachycephalidae

The family Pachycephalidae includes the whistlers, shrikethrushes, and some of the pitohuis.

Mangrove whistler, Pachycephala cinerea

Old World orioles
Order: PasseriformesFamily: Oriolidae

The Old World orioles are colourful passerine birds. They are not related to the New World orioles.

Black-naped oriole, Oriolus chinensis
Slender-billed oriole, Oriolus tenuirostris (A)
Black-hooded oriole, Oriolus xanthornus
Maroon oriole, Oriolus traillii
Silver oriole, Oriolus mellianus

Woodswallows, bellmagpies, and allies
Order: PasseriformesFamily: Artamidae

The woodswallows are soft-plumaged, somber-coloured passerine birds. They are smooth, agile flyers with moderately large, semi-triangular wings.

Ashy woodswallow, Artamus fuscus

Vangas, helmetshrikes, and allies
Order: PasseriformesFamily: Vangidae

The family Vangidae is highly variable, though most members of it resemble true shrikes to some degree.

Large woodshrike, Tephrodornis gularis
Common woodshrike, Tephrodornis pondicerianus
Bar-winged flycatcher-shrike, Hemipus picatus

Ioras
Order: PasseriformesFamily: Aegithinidae

The ioras are bulbul-like birds of open forest or thorn scrub, but whereas that group tends to be drab in colouration, ioras are sexually dimorphic, with the males being brightly plumaged in yellows and greens.

Common iora, Aegithina tiphia
Great iora, Aegithina lafresnayei

Fantails
Order: PasseriformesFamily: Rhipiduridae

The fantails are small insectivorous birds which are specialist aerial feeders.

Malaysian pied-fantail, Rhipidura javanica
White-throated fantail, Rhipidura albicollis
White-browed fantail, Rhipidura aureola

Drongos
Order: PasseriformesFamily: Dicruridae

The drongos are mostly black or dark grey in colour, sometimes with metallic tints. They have long forked tails, and some Asian species have elaborate tail decorations. They have short legs and sit very upright when perched, like a shrike. They flycatch or take prey from the ground.

Black drongo, Dicrurus macrocercus
Ashy drongo, Dicrurus leucophaeus
Crow-billed drongo, Dicrurus annectens
Bronzed drongo, Dicrurus aeneus
Lesser racket-tailed drongo, Dicrurus remifer
Hair-crested drongo, Dicrurus hottentottus
Greater racket-tailed drongo, Dicrurus paradiseus

Monarch flycatchers
Order: PasseriformesFamily: Monarchidae

The monarch flycatchers are small to medium-sized insectivorous passerines which hunt by flycatching.

Black-naped monarch, Hypothymis azurea
Japanese paradise-flycatcher, Terpsiphone atrocaudata (A)
Amur paradise-flycatcher, Terpsiphone incei
Blyth's paradise-flycatcher, Terpsiphone affinis

Shrikes
Order: PasseriformesFamily: Laniidae

Shrikes are passerine birds known for their habit of catching other birds and small animals and impaling the uneaten portions of their bodies on thorns. A typical shrike's beak is hooked, like a bird of prey.

Tiger shrike, Lanius tigrinus
Brown shrike, Lanius cristatus
Burmese shrike, Lanius collurioides
Long-tailed shrike, Lanius schach
Gray-backed shrike, Lanius tephronotus

Crows, jays, and magpies
Order: PasseriformesFamily: Corvidae

The family Corvidae includes crows, ravens, jays, choughs, magpies, treepies, nutcrackers and ground jays. Corvids are above average in size among the Passeriformes, and some of the larger species show high levels of intelligence.

Eurasian jay, Garrulus glandarius
Red-billed blue-magpie, Urocissa erythrorhyncha
Common green-magpie, Cissa chinensis
Indochinese green-magpie, Cissa hypoleuca
Rufous treepie, Dendrocitta vagabunda
Racket-tailed treepie, Crypsirina temia
Ratchet-tailed treepie, Temnurus temnurus
Large-billed crow, Corvus macrorhynchos

Fairy flycatchers
Order: PasseriformesFamily: Stenostiridae

Most of the species of this small family are found in Africa, though a few inhabit tropical Asia. They are not closely related to other birds called "flycatchers".

Gray-headed canary-flycatcher, Culicicapa ceylonensis

Tits, chickadees, and titmice
Order: PasseriformesFamily: Paridae

The Paridae are mainly small stocky woodland species with short stout bills. Some have crests. They are adaptable birds, with a mixed diet including seeds and insects.

Cinereous tit, Parus cinereus

Larks
Order: PasseriformesFamily: Alaudidae

Larks are small terrestrial birds with often extravagant songs and display flights. Most larks are fairly dull in appearance. Their food is insects and seeds.

Horsfield’s bushlark, Mirafra javanica
Indochinese bushlark, Mirafra erythrocephala
Oriental skylark, Alauda gulgula

Cisticolas and allies
Order: PasseriformesFamily: Cisticolidae

The Cisticolidae are warblers found mainly in warmer southern regions of the Old World. They are generally very small birds of drab brown or grey appearance found in open country such as grassland or scrub.

Common tailorbird, Orthotomus sutorius
Dark-necked tailorbird, Orthotomus atrogularis
Cambodian tailorbird, Orthotomus chaktomuk (E)
Ashy tailorbird, Orthotomus ruficeps (A)
Annam prinia, Prinia rocki (A)
Brown prinia, Prinia polychroa
Hill prinia, Prinia superciliaris
Rufescent prinia, Prinia rufescens
Gray-breasted prinia, Prinia hodgsonii
Yellow-bellied prinia, Prinia flaviventris
Plain prinia, Prinia inornata
Zitting cisticola, Cisticola juncidis
Golden-headed cisticola, Cisticola exilis

Reed warblers and allies
Order: PasseriformesFamily: Acrocephalidae

The members of this family are usually rather large for "warblers". Most are rather plain olivaceous brown above with much yellow to beige below. They are usually found in open woodland, reedbeds, or tall grass. The family occurs mostly in southern to western Eurasia and surroundings, but it also ranges far into the Pacific, with some species in Africa.
 
Thick-billed warbler, Arundinax aedon
Black-browed reed warbler, Acrocephalus bistrigiceps
Blunt-winged warbler, Acrocephalus concinens
Manchurian reed warbler, Acrocephalus tangorum
Blyth's reed warbler, Acrocephalus dumetorum (A)
Oriental reed warbler, Acrocephalus orientalis

Grassbirds and allies
Order: PasseriformesFamily: Locustellidae

Locustellidae are a family of small insectivorous songbirds found mainly in Eurasia, Africa, and the Australian region. They are smallish birds with tails that are usually long and pointed, and tend to be drab brownish or buffy all over.

Pallas's grasshopper warbler, Helopsaltes certhiola
Lanceolated warbler, Locustella lanceolata
Chinese bush warbler, Locustella tacsanowskia (A)
Baikal bush warbler, Locustella davidi (A)
Striated grassbird, Megalurus palustris

Cupwings
Order: PasseriformesFamily: Pnoepygidae

The members of this small family are found in mountainous parts of South and South East Asia.

Pygmy cupwing, Pnoepyga pusilla

Swallows
Order: PasseriformesFamily: Hirundinidae

The family Hirundinidae is adapted to aerial feeding. They have a slender streamlined body, long pointed wings and a short bill with a wide gape. The feet are adapted to perching rather than walking, and the front toes are partially joined at the base.

Gray-throated martin, Riparia chinensis
Bank swallow, Riparia riparia
Pale sand martin, 	Riparia diluta'
Dusky crag-martin, Ptyonoprogne concolorBarn swallow, Hirundo rusticaWire-tailed swallow, Hirundo smithiiPacific swallow, Hirundo tahiticaRed-rumped swallow, Cecropis dauricaStriated swallow, Cecropis striolataCommon house-martin, Delichon urbicaAsian house-martin, Delichon dasypusBulbuls
Order: PasseriformesFamily: Pycnonotidae

Bulbuls are medium-sized songbirds. Some are colourful with yellow, red or orange vents, cheeks, throats or supercilia, but most are drab, with uniform olive-brown to black plumage. Some species have distinct crests.

Black-headed bulbul, Brachypodius melanocephalosBlack-crested bulbul, Rubigula flaviventrisRed-whiskered bulbul, Pycnonotus jocosusSooty-headed bulbul, Pycnonotus aurigasterStripe-throated bulbul, Pycnonotus finlaysoniYellow-vented bulbul, Pycnonotus goiavierOlive-winged bulbul, Pycnonotus plumosus (A)
Streak-eared bulbul, Pycnonotus conradiOchraceous bulbul, Alophoixus ochraceusPuff-throated bulbul, Alophoixus pallidusGray-eyed bulbul, Iole propinquaBlack bulbul, Hypsipetes leucocephalusAshy bulbul, Hemixos flavalaMountain bulbul, Ixos mcclellandiiLeaf warblers
Order: PasseriformesFamily: Phylloscopidae

Leaf warblers are a family of small insectivorous birds found mostly in Eurasia and ranging into Wallacea and Africa. The species are of various sizes, often green-plumaged above and yellow below, or more subdued with greyish-green to greyish-brown colours.

Yellow-browed warbler, Phylloscopus inornatusHume's warbler, Phylloscopus humei (A)
Lemon-rumped warbler, Phylloscopus chloronotusRadde's warbler, Phylloscopus schwarziYellow-streaked warbler, Phylloscopus armandii (A)
Dusky warbler, Phylloscopus fuscatusBuff-throated warbler, Phylloscopus fuscatus (A)
Eastern crowned warbler, Phylloscopus coronatusGray-crowned warbler, Phylloscopus tephrocephalusMartens's warbler, Phylloscopus omeiensis (A)
Alström's warbler, Phylloscopus sororGreenish warbler, Phylloscopus trochiloidesTwo-barred warbler, Phylloscopus plumbeitarsusPale-legged leaf warbler, Phylloscopus tenellipesSakhalin leaf warbler, Phylloscopus borealoides (A)
Arctic warbler, Phylloscopus borealisKamchatka leaf warbler, Phylloscopus examinandusChestnut-crowned warbler, Phylloscopus castanicepsSulphur-breasted warbler, Phylloscopus rickettiBlyth's leaf warbler, Phylloscopus reguloidesClaudia's leaf warbler, Phylloscopus claudiaeDavison's leaf warbler, Phylloscopus davisoniKloss's leaf warbler, Phylloscopus ogilviegrantiBush warblers and allies
Order: PasseriformesFamily: Scotocercidae

The members of this family are found throughout Africa, Asia, and Polynesia. Their taxonomy is in flux, and some authorities place some genera in other families.

Asian stubtail, Urosphena squameicepsGray-bellied tesia, Tesia cyaniventerYellow-bellied warbler, Abroscopus superciliarisMountain tailorbird, Phyllergates cuculatusLong-tailed tits
Order: PasseriformesFamily: Aegithalidae

Long-tailed tits are a group of small passerine birds with medium to long tails. They make woven bag nests in trees. Most eat a mixed diet which includes insects.

Black-throated tit, Aegithalos concinnusSylviid warblers, parrotbills, and allies
Order: PasseriformesFamily: Sylviidae

The family Sylviidae is a group of small insectivorous passerine birds. They mainly occur as breeding species, as the common name implies, in Europe, Asia and, to a lesser extent, Africa. Most are of generally undistinguished appearance, but many have distinctive songs.

Yellow-eyed babbler, Chrysomma sinenseBlack-headed parrotbill, Psittiparus margaritaeWhite-eyes, yuhinas, and allies
Order: PasseriformesFamily: Zosteropidae

The white-eyes are small and mostly undistinguished, their plumage above being generally some dull colour like greenish-olive, but some species have a white or bright yellow throat, breast or lower parts, and several have buff flanks. As their name suggests, many species have a white ring around each eye.

Black-chinned yuhina, Yuhina nigrimentaChestnut-flanked white-eye, Zosterops erythropleurusIndian white-eye, Zosterops palpebrosusHume's white-eye, Zosterops auriventerEverett's white-eye, Zosterops everetti (A)

Tree-babblers, scimitar-babblers, and allies
Order: PasseriformesFamily: Timaliidae

The babblers, or timaliids, are somewhat diverse in size and colouration, but are characterised by soft fluffy plumage.

Chestnut-capped babbler, Timalia pileataGray-faced tit-babbler, Mixornis kelleyiPin-striped tit-babbler, Mixornis gularisGolden babbler, Cyanoderma chrysaeumRufous-fronted babbler, Cyanoderma rufifrons (A)
Rufous-capped babbler, Cyanoderma ruficeps(A)
Red-billed scimitar-babbler, Pomatorhinus ochraceiceps (A)
White-browed scimitar-babbler, Pomatorhinus schisticepsLarge scimitar-babbler, Erythrogenys hypoleucosGray-throated babbler, Stachyris nigriceps (A)

Ground babblers and allies
Order: PasseriformesFamily: Pellorneidae

These small to medium-sized songbirds have soft fluffy plumage but are otherwise rather diverse. Members of the genus Illadopsis are found in forests, but some other genera are birds of scrublands.

Chinese grassbird, Graminicola striatus (A)
Scaly-crowned babbler, Malacopteron cinereumCollared babbler, Gampsorhynchus torquatusRufous-throated fulvetta, Schoeniparus rufogularisPuff-throated babbler, Pellorneum ruficepsSpot-throated babbler, Pellorneum albiventre (A)
Buff-breasted babbler, Pellorneum tickelliAbbott's babbler, Malacocincla abbottiStreaked wren-babbler, Turdinus brevicaudatusLaughingthrushes and allies
Order: PasseriformesFamily: Leiothrichidae

The members of this family are diverse in size and colouration, though those of genus Turdoides tend to be brown or greyish. The family is found in Africa, India, and southeast Asia.
 
Black-browed fulvetta, Alcippe groteiMountain fulvetta, Alcippe peracensisBlue-winged minla, Actinodura cyanouropteraSilver-eared mesia, Leiothrix argentaurisLesser necklaced laughingthrush, Garrulax monilegerWhite-crested laughingthrush, Garrulax leucolophusBlack-hooded laughingthrush, Garrulax milletiCambodian laughingthrush, Garrulax ferrarius (E)
White-cheeked laughingthrush, Pterorhinus vassaliBlack-throated laughingthrush, Pterorhinus chinensisGreater necklaced laughingthrush, Pterorhinus pectoralis (A)

Nuthatches
Order: PasseriformesFamily: Sittidae

Nuthatches are small woodland birds. They have the unusual ability to climb down trees head first, unlike other birds which can only go upwards. Nuthatches have big heads, short tails and powerful bills and feet.

Burmese nuthatch, Sitta neglectaVelvet-fronted nuthatch, Sitta frontalisStarlings
Order: PasseriformesFamily: Sturnidae

Starlings are small to medium-sized passerine birds. Their flight is strong and direct and they are very gregarious. Their preferred habitat is fairly open country. They eat insects and fruit. Plumage is typically dark with a metallic sheen..

Asian glossy starling, Aplonis panayensis (A)
Golden-crested myna, Ampeliceps coronatusCommon hill myna, Gracula religiosaEuropean starling, Sturnus vulgaris (A)
Rosy starling, Pastor roseus (A)
Daurian starling, Agropsar sturninaChestnut-cheeked starling, Agropsar philippensis (A)
Black-collared starling, Gracupica nigricollisSiamese pied starling, Gracupica floweriWhite-shouldered starling, Sturnia sinensisBrahminy starling, Sturnia pagodarum (A)
Chestnut-tailed starling, Sturnia malabaricaRed-billed starling, Spodiopsar sericeus (A)
Common myna, Acridotheres tristisVinous-breasted myna, Acridotheres leucocephalusGreat myna, Acridotheres grandisThrushes and allies
Order: PasseriformesFamily: Turdidae

The thrushes are a group of passerine birds that occur mainly in the Old World. They are plump, soft plumaged, small to medium-sized insectivores or sometimes omnivores, often feeding on the ground. Many have attractive songs.

Dark-sided thrush, Zoothera marginataWhite's thrush, Zoothera aureaScaly thrush, Zoothera daumaGreen cochoa, Cochoa viridisSiberian thrush, Geokichla sibirica (A)
Orange-headed thrush, Geokichla citrinaChinese blackbird, Turdus mandarinusJapanese thrush, Turdus cardis (A)
Eyebrowed thrush, Turdus obscurusDusky thrush, Turdus eunomus (A)
Naumann's thrush, Turdus naumanni (A)

Old World flycatchers
Order: PasseriformesFamily: Muscicapidae

Old World flycatchers are a large group of small passerine birds native to the Old World. They are mainly small arboreal insectivores. The appearance of these birds is highly varied, but they mostly have weak songs and harsh calls.

Dark-sided flycatcher, Muscicapa sibiricaAsian brown flycatcher, Muscicapa dauuricaBrown-breasted flycatcher, Muscicapa muttui (A)
Brown-streaked flycatcher, Muscicapa williamsoniOriental magpie-robin, Copsychus saularisWhite-rumped shama, Copsychus malabaricusRufous-browed flycatcher, Anthipes solitarisWhite-tailed flycatcher, Cyornis concretus (A)
Hainan blue flycatcher, Cyornis hainanusPale blue flycatcher, Cyornis unicolorChinese blue flycatcher, Cyornis glaucicomansLarge blue flycatcher, Cyornis magnirostris (A)
Hill blue flycatcher, Cyornis whiteiIndochinese blue flycatcher, Cyornis sumatrensisLarge niltava, Niltava grandisFujian niltava, Niltava davidiVivid niltava, Niltava vividaBlue-and-white flycatcher, Cyanoptila cyanomelanaVerditer flycatcher, Eumyias thalassinaLesser shortwing, Brachypteryx leucophrysHimalayan shortwing, Brachypteryx cruralisRufous-headed robin, Larvivora ruficeps (A)
Siberian blue robin, Larvivora cyaneBluethroat, Luscinia svecicaBlue whistling-thrush, Myophonus caeruleusWhite-crowned forktail, Enicurus leschenaulti (A)
Slaty-backed forktail, Enicurus schistaceusSiberian rubythroat, Calliope calliopeWhite-tailed robin, Myiomela leucuraHimalayan bluetail, Tarsiger rufilatus (A)
Yellow-rumped flycatcher, Ficedula zanthopygiaGreen-backed flycatcher, Ficedula elisae (A)
Narcissus flycatcher, Ficedula narcissinaMugimaki flycatcher, Ficedula mugimakiSlaty-backed flycatcher, Ficedula hodgsoniiSnowy-browed flycatcher, Ficedula hyperythraLittle pied flycatcher, Ficedula westermanniTaiga flycatcher, Ficedula albicillaWhite-throated rock-thrush, Monticola gularisBlue rock-thrush, Monticola solitariusSiberian stonechat, Saxicola maurus (A)
Amur stonechat, Saxicola stejnegeriPied bushchat, Saxicola caprataGray bushchat, Saxicola ferreusFlowerpeckers
Order: PasseriformesFamily: Dicaeidae

The flowerpeckers are very small, stout, often brightly coloured birds, with short tails, short thick curved bills and tubular tongues.

Thick-billed flowerpecker, Dicaeum agileYellow-vented flowerpecker, Dicaeum chrysorrheumPlain flowerpecker, Dicaeum minullumFire-breasted flowerpecker, Dicaeum ignipectusScarlet-backed flowerpecker, Dicaeum cruentatumSunbirds and spiderhunters
Order: PasseriformesFamily: Nectariniidae

The sunbirds and spiderhunters are very small passerine birds which feed largely on nectar, although they will also take insects, especially when feeding young. Flight is fast and direct on their short wings. Most species can take nectar by hovering like a hummingbird, but usually perch to feed.

Ruby-cheeked sunbird, Chalcoparia singalensisBrown-throated sunbird, Anthreptes malacensisVan Hasselt's sunbird, Leptocoma brasilianaCopper-throated sunbird, Leptocoma calcostethaPurple sunbird, Cinnyris asiaticusOlive-backed sunbird, Cinnyris jugularisBlack-throated sunbird, Aethopyga saturataGreen-tailed sunbird, Aethopyga nipalensisCrimson sunbird, Aethopyga siparajaPurple-naped spiderhunter, Kurochkinegramma hypogrammicumLittle spiderhunter, Arachnothera longirostraStreaked spiderhunter, Arachnothera magnaFairy-bluebirds
Order: PasseriformesFamily: Irenidae

The fairy-bluebirds are bulbul-like birds of open forest or thorn scrub. The males are dark-blue and the females a duller green.

Asian fairy-bluebird, Irena puellaLeafbirds
Order: PasseriformesFamily: Chloropseidae

The leafbirds are small, bulbul-like birds. The males are brightly plumaged, usually in greens and yellows.

Blue-winged leafbird, Chloropsis cochinchinensisGolden-fronted leafbird, Chloropsis aurifronsWeavers and allies
Order: PasseriformesFamily: Ploceidae

The weavers are small passerine birds related to the finches. They are seed-eating birds with rounded conical bills. The males of many species are brightly coloured, usually in red or yellow and black, some species show variation in colour only in the breeding season.

Streaked weaver, Ploceus manyarBaya weaver, Ploceus philippinusAsian golden weaver, Ploceus hypoxanthusWaxbills and allies
Order: PasseriformesFamily: Estrildidae

The estrildid finches are small passerine birds of the Old World tropics and Australasia. They are gregarious and often colonial seed eaters with short thick but pointed bills. They are all similar in structure and habits, but have wide variation in plumage colours and patterns.

Scaly-breasted munia, Lonchura punctulataWhite-rumped munia, Lonchura striataChestnut munia, Lonchura atricapillaPin-tailed parrotfinch, Erythrura prasinaRed avadavat, Amandava amandavaOld World sparrows
Order: PasseriformesFamily: Passeridae

Old World sparrows are small passerine birds. In general, sparrows tend to be small, plump, brown or grey birds with short tails and short powerful beaks. Sparrows are seed eaters, but they also consume small insects.

House sparrow, Passer domesticusPlain-backed sparrow, Passer flaveolusEurasian tree sparrow, Passer montanusWagtails and pipits
Order: PasseriformesFamily: Motacillidae

Motacillidae is a family of small passerine birds with medium to long tails. They include the wagtails, longclaws and pipits. They are slender, ground feeding insectivores of open country.

Forest wagtail, Dendronanthus indicusGray wagtail, Motacilla cinereaWestern yellow wagtail, Motacilla flavaEastern yellow wagtail, Motacilla tschutschensisCitrine wagtail, Motacilla citreolaMekong wagtail, Motacilla samveasnaeWhite wagtail, Motacilla albaRichard's pipit, Anthus richardiPaddyfield pipit, Anthus rufulusOlive-backed pipit, Anthus hodgsoniRed-throated pipit, Anthus cervinusFinches, euphonias, and allies
Order: PasseriformesFamily: Fringillidae

Finches are seed-eating passerine birds, that are small to moderately large and have a strong beak, usually conical and in some species very large. All have twelve tail feathers and nine primaries. These birds have a bouncing flight with alternating bouts of flapping and gliding on closed wings, and most sing well.

Common rosefinch, Carpodacus erythrinus (A)

Old World buntings
Order: PasseriformesFamily: Emberizidae

The emberizids are a large family of passerine birds. They are seed-eating birds with distinctively shaped bills. Many emberizid species have distinctive head patterns.

Black-headed bunting, Emberiza melanocephala (A)
Red-headed bunting, Emberiza bruniceps (A)
Chestnut-eared bunting, Emberiza fucataYellow-breasted bunting, Emberiza aureolaLittle bunting, Emberiza pusilla (A)
Black-faced bunting, Emberiza spodocephala (A)
Chestnut bunting, Emberiza rutila''

See also
List of birds
Lists of birds by region

References

Cambodia
Cambodia
'
birds